On an Island is the third solo studio album by Pink Floyd member David Gilmour. It was released in the UK on 6 March 2006, Gilmour's 60th birthday, and in the United States the following day. It was his first solo album in 22 years since About Face in 1984 and 12 years since Pink Floyd's 1994 album The Division Bell.

History
The album features Robert Wyatt, Jools Holland, Georgie Fame, David Crosby, Graham Nash, Pink Floyd keyboardist Richard Wright, early Pink Floyd member Bob Klose and Pink Floyd session and touring musician Guy Pratt. Chris Thomas and Roxy Music's Phil Manzanera assisted with production. Engineering duties were undertaken by long-time collaborator Andy Jackson. The lyrics were principally written by Gilmour's wife, writer Polly Samson.

Recording
Much of the album was recorded in Gilmour's private studio aboard his houseboat Astoria. The track "Smile" was heard briefly in an unmastered form on the BBC2 show Three Men in a Boat which retraced a trip on the River Thames that passed the houseboat. Other sections were recorded at David's farm in Sussex and Mark Knopfler's British Grove Studios.

Orchestrations on the album were arranged by noted Polish film composer Zbigniew Preisner and conducted by Robert Ziegler. The orchestra was recorded at Abbey Road Studios by Simon Rhodes.

Singles
The album also featured two singles; the title track "On an Island" and "Smile," the latter peaking at #72 on the UK Singles Chart. "On an Island" also peaked at #27 on the Billboard Mainstream Rock Tracks chart.

Promo Single edits of "Take a Breath" and "This Heaven" were issued to coincide with the U.S. leg of the tour, while "Smile" was the second single in the UK.

Other releases
Copies of the album initially purchased from Best Buy in the United States contained an exclusive bonus audio CD with the instrumental track "Island Jam," which was subsequently released on the CD single for "Smile" in Europe.

The album was re-released in November 2006 with a bonus DVD of live tracks and other material.

A 5.1 mix of the album was released as part of the deluxe edition of "Live In Gdansk"

Chart performance
On an Island entered the UK charts at #1, giving Gilmour his first ever chart-topping album outside of Pink Floyd. It reached #1 on the European Chart, and #2 in Canada, Portugal and Iceland. It has also provided Gilmour with his first US Top 10 album, reaching #6.

Track listing
All music written by David Gilmour.

Non-album tracks
"Island Jam"

"Island Jam" (6:33) (not to be confused with "Island Jam 2007") was recorded as the b-side to the "Smile" single. The track was produced by Gilmour.

Personnel

David Gilmour – guitars (all), lead vocals (all except 1, 5, 7, "Island Jam"), lap steel guitars, electric piano (2), percussion (2, 3, 8, 9, 10), bass guitar (3, 8, 9, 10), piano (3, 8, 9), alto saxophone (5), cümbüş (7), bass harmonica (7), Hammond organ (7, 8, 9, 10), harmonica (2)
Guy Pratt – bass guitar (2, 4, "Island Jam")
Richard Wright – Hammond organ (2), co-lead vocals (3)
David Crosby – vocals (2)
Graham Nash – vocals (2)
Rado Klose – guitar (2, 3)
Chris Stainton – Hammond organ (3)
Andy Newmark – drums (2, 3, 6, 10), percussion (7)
Jools Holland – piano (3)
Polly Samson – piano (3), backing vocals (8)
Phil Manzanera – guitar (4, 6, 7)
Leszek Możdżer – piano (4, 9)

Ged Lynch – drums (4, "Island Jam")
Caroline Dale – cello (4, 5, 7)
Chris Laurence – double bass (5, 9)
Ilan Eshkeri – programming (5, 9)
Georgie Fame – Hammond organ (6)
BJ Cole – Weissenborn guitar (7)
Robert Wyatt – cornet (7), percussion (7), vocals (7)
Willie Wilson – drums (8)
Alasdair Malloy – glass harmonica (7, 9)
Lucy Wakeford – harp (9)
Chris Thomas – keyboards (9)
Zbigniew Preisner – orchestration (1, 2, 4, 5, 6, 7, 8, 9, 10)
Paul "Wix" Wickens – Hammond organ ("Island Jam")

Tour

Gilmour toured the album with Richard Wright, Phil Manzanera and long-time members of the live Pink Floyd band, Guy Pratt and Jon Carin. Steve DiStanislao was brought in as drummer. The shows included the entire On an Island album plus Pink Floyd songs such as "Shine on You Crazy Diamond", "Echoes", "Fat Old Sun", "Arnold Layne", "High Hopes", "Wish You Were Here" and "Comfortably Numb" among others. No songs from Gilmour's two previous solo albums were played. The tour is documented on the DVD/Blu-ray Remember That Night and the live album & DVD Live in Gdansk.

Charts

Weekly charts

Year-end charts

Certifications and sales

References

David Gilmour albums
2006 albums
EMI Records albums
Columbia Records albums
Albums produced by Chris Thomas (record producer)
Albums produced by David Gilmour
Albums produced by Phil Manzanera
Albums recorded in a home studio